The 1971 Rhineland-Palatinate state election was conducted on 21 March 1971 to elect members to the Landtag, the state legislature of Rhineland-Palatinate, West Germany.

|-
|colspan=15| 
|-
! style="background-color:#E9E9E9;text-align:left;" width=300px colspan=2|Party
! style="background-color:#E9E9E9;text-align:right;" width=50px |Vote %
! style="background-color:#E9E9E9;text-align:right;" width=50px |Vote % ±
! style="background-color:#E9E9E9;text-align:right;" width=50px |Seats
! style="background-color:#E9E9E9;text-align:right;" width=50px |Seats ±
|-
| width=5px style="background-color: " |
| style="text-align:left;" | Christian Democratic Union
| style="text-align:right;" | 50.0
| style="text-align:right;" | +3.3
| style="text-align:right;" | 53
| style="text-align:right;" | +4
|-
| style="background-color: " |
| style="text-align:left;" | Social Democratic Party
| style="text-align:right;" | 40.5
| style="text-align:right;" | +3.7
| style="text-align:right;" | 44
| style="text-align:right;" | +5
|-
| style="background-color: " |
| style="text-align:left;" | Free Democratic Party
| style="text-align:right;" | 5.9
| style="text-align:right;" | –2.4
| style="text-align:right;" | 3
| style="text-align:right;" | –5
|-
| style="background-color: " |
| style="text-align:left;" | National Democratic Party
| style="text-align:right;" | 2.7
| style="text-align:right;" | –4.2
| style="text-align:right;" | 0
| style="text-align:right;" | –4
|-
| style="background-color: " |
| style="text-align:left;" | German Communist Party
| style="text-align:right;" | 0.9
| style="text-align:right;" | N/A
| style="text-align:right;" | 0
| style="text-align:right;" | N/A
|- style="background: #E9E9E9"
! style="text-align:left;" colspan=2| Total
| 100.0
| —
| 100
| ±0
|-
| colspan=9 style="text-align:left;" | Source: parties-and-elections.de
|}

1971
1971 elections in Germany
1971 in West Germany